Apremont is a commune in the Haute-Saône department in the Bourgogne-Franche-Comté region in eastern France.

Demography

See also
Communes of the Haute-Saône department

References

Communes of Haute-Saône